Nicholas Ndubi Muyoti (born 8 September 1976) is a retired Kenyan. international defender cum midfielder. He is the current head coach of Kenyan Premier League side Nairobi City Stars.

Muyoti is a former Kenya captain best remembered for lifting the Castle Cup trophy in 2002.

Career
Muyoti started out his career at lower-tier side Kenyatta Hospital F.C. while still a student at Upper Hill School.

Early life
Muyoti was born on 8 September 1976 in Nairobi. He went to school at Our Lady of Mercy Primary School before moving to Mumias Boys Primary School. He then proceeded to Amukura Secondary School in Busia before ending up at Nairobi's Upper Hill School.

AFC Leopards
While at Kenyatta Hospital F.C. he tried out with AFC Leopards whom he joined in 1997 where he spent six seasons before heading to Thika United in 2002. He returned to the same club nine years later in 2011 to end his playing career.

Singapore
After four seasons at Thika United in 2002, Muyoti moved to Sporting Afrique for the 2006 S.League,. Described as a conscientious leader, Muyoti captained Sporting Afrique at the 2006 S.League,

India
After Singapore, Muyoti moved to Churchill Brothers for 2006, the captain was Man of the Match as they drew with Sporting Clube de Goa 1-1 despite earning a yellow card which left him out for the 11th round. 

He then moved to Sporting Clube de Goa for 2007 season, the Kenyan had to leave the Flaming Oranje  in 2008 due to injury, out for eight months.

Return to Kenya
After India, Muyoti returned to Thika United for a season in 2008 then made moves in each of the next seasons to Sher Karuturi, Sofapaka F.C. before finally returning 'home' to AFC Leopards in 2011 where he hanged his boots as a player at the close of that season.

Swindon Town
In late 2002, it was reported that Muyoti had caught the eye of English side Swindon Town. as the Kenya national football team toured England for a series of friendly games. The reports later stated the deal did not materialize.

National team
While at AFC Leopards, Muyoti was called up to the Kenya national football team in 2001 and played for the national team till the year 2003. 

He was handed his first cap at the Amahoro Stadium by Reinhard Fabisch in a game against Ethiopia in the final of 2001 CECAFA Cup.

Management
Muyoti began his journey to coaching when, at the end of the 2011 season at AFC Leopards, he was named the assistant coach, then team manager, and back as an assistant. He left the club towards the end of 2013 to join Oserian FC as head coach before returning to AFC Leopards in 2016 as an assistant coach. 

He moved to Zetech University at the onset of 2017 for a short stint before heading to Thika United as an assistant coach first, then head coach. Head coach roles at Nzoia Sugar, Kakamega Homeboyz then to his current station Nairobi City Stars  then followed.

Career statistics

International

International goals
 (scores and results list Kenya's goal tally first)

Honours

Club
AFC Leopards
 Moi Golden Cup: (2001)
Kenya
 2002 CECAFA Cup
 Castle Lager Cup (East Africa): 2002

References

External links 
 
 

Kenyan footballers

1976 births
Living people
Association football midfielders
Association football defenders
Kenyan football managers
A.F.C. Leopards players
Thika United F.C. players
Churchill Brothers FC Goa players
Sporting Clube de Goa players
Vegpro F.C. players
Kenya international footballers
Kenyan Premier League players